The Adel Safar government was the third Syrian government formed during the presidency of Bashar al-Assad. On 2 April 2011, President Bashar al-Assad issued Decree No. 134 designating Adel Safar to form a new Government. On 14 April 2011, the new Government was announced through Decree No. 136.

Cabinet composition

Portfolios
 Minister of Defense: Ali Habib Mahmud
 Minister of Foreign Affairs and Expatriates: Walid Muallem
 Minister of Oil and Mineral Resources: Sufian Allaw
 Minister of Communications and Technology: Emad Abdul-Ghani Sabouni
 Minister of Endowments (Awqaf): Mohammed Abdul Sattar
 Minister of Local Administration: Omar Ibrahim Ghalawanji
 Minister of Presidential Affairs: Mansour Fadlallah Azzam
 Minister of Tourism: Lamia Merei Assi
 Minister of Culture: Mohammad Riyad Hussein Ismat
 Minister of Irrigation: George Malki Soumi
 Minister of Justice: Tayseer Qala Awwad
 Minister of Agriculture and Agrarian Reform: Riyad Farid Hijab
 Minister of Social Affairs and Labor: Radwan al-Habib
 Minister of Higher Education: Abdul-Razzaq Sheikh Issa
 Minister of Interior: Mohammad Ibrahim al-Shaar
 Minister of Finance: Mohammad al Jililati
 Minister of Economy and Trade: Mohammad Nidal al-Shaar
 Minister of Education: Saleh al-Rashed
 Minister of Health: Wael Nader al-Halqi
 Minister of Housing and Construction: Hala Mohammad al-Nasse
 Minister of Transport: Fayssal Abbas
 Minister of Electricity: Imad Mohammad Deeb Khamis
 Minister of Information: Adnan Hassan Mahmoud
 Minister of Industry: Adnan Salkho

Ministers of State
 State Minister for Environmental Affairs: Kawkab Sabah al-Daya
 State Minister: Yousef Suleiman al-Ahmad
 State Minister: Ghiath Jeraatli
 State Minister: Hussein Mahmoud Ferzat
 Minister of State: Joseph Suwaid
 Minister of State: Hassan al-Sari

See also
Cabinet of Syria
Government ministries of Syria
List of prime ministers of Syria
List of foreign ministers of Syria

References

2011 establishments in Syria
Bashar al-Assad
Syria
 
Lists of political office-holders in Syria
2012 disestablishments in Syria
Cabinets established in 2011
Cabinets disestablished in 2012